"Lost in Your Love" is a song by English producer Redlight. The track was released as a digital download in the United Kingdom on 5 August 2012, where it debuted at  5 on the UK Singles Chart, making it Redlight's highest-charting single. The song features the vocals of Baby Sol and Lottie Tricity.

Music video
A music video to accompany the release of "Lost in Your Love" was first released onto YouTube on 27 June 2012 at a total length of two minutes and fifty-one seconds.

Track listing

Charts

Weekly charts

Year-end charts

Release history

References

2011 songs
2012 singles
Polydor Records singles
Redlight (musician) songs
Songs written by Jonny Coffer